Bruce Walkup (born August 21, 1944 in Downey, California) is a retired American racecar driver.

Walkup raced in the USAC Championship Car series in the 1967-1971 seasons, with 35 career starts, including the 1969 and 1970 Indianapolis 500 races.  He finished in the top ten 11 times, with his best finish in 4th position in 1969 at Sacramento.

Walkup was formerly the president of the Indiana State Fair board.

References

1944 births
American racing drivers
Living people
Indianapolis 500 drivers
Sportspeople from Downey, California
Racing drivers from California
USAC Silver Crown Series drivers